Mount Darwin is a flat-topped mountain in the Sierra Nevada, on the border of between Fresno and Inyo counties in Kings Canyon National Park and the John Muir Wilderness of California.

History
Two Australian geologists, Ernest Clayton Andrews and Willard D. Johnson, made the first recorded ascent on August 12, 1908.

The modern name of the mountain was given to it in 1895 by Theodore S. Solomons and E. C. Bonner of the United States Geological Survey as part of a series of mountains named for the six major exponents of the theory of evolution. Mount Darwin is named for the naturalist, Charles Darwin. Other nearby mountains in the Evolution Group include Mount Mendel, Mount Fiske, Mount Haeckel, Mount Huxley, Mount Spencer, Mount Wallace, and Mount Lamarck. The area around the peaks, known as the Evolution Region, includes Evolution Basin and Evolution Valley.

Nearby landmarks include Darwin Glacier and Darwin Canyon.

A similar exercise in naming mountains after naturalists and other late nineteenth century proponents of evolution theory was carried out at the West Coast Range in Tasmania, Australia. In contrast, Mount Darwin in Tierra del Fuego was given its name during the voyage of the Beagle by captain Robert FitzRoy to celebrate Darwin's 25th birthday on 12 February 1834.

See also
 List of mountain peaks of California

References

External links

Mountains of Kings Canyon National Park
Mountains of the John Muir Wilderness
Mountains of Fresno County, California
Mountains of Inyo County, California
Mount Darwin